Raees Shamsuddin Bulbul (born 21 February 1857, original name Raees Muhammad Paryal) was a poet, prose writer, journalist, social worker and politician. He was born at Mehar, Dadu District, Sindh. His real name was changed to Shamsuddin on the advice of his Maternal  Uncle (Aakhoond Nehal khan) . "Bulbul" was his pen name.

Early life

Raees Shamsuddin bulbul was educated in Sindhi, Arabic and Persian. He was a superintendent in the Engineering  irrigation department for a short time. He moved to Lahore for one year then moved to New Delhi for one year. After that he migrated to Hyderabadb dakhan  for  nine years and starts his career as editor in  Dakhan punch , khursheed Dakhan , panja e foulad,  then moved back  to sindh in his Village Mehar , sindh in 1889 . In Karachi , sindh  he met Hassan Ali Effendi who appointed him as an editor in Muawin ul Islam newspaper. After Death of his elder brother Raees peer buksh khan  he come back to  pavilion and take care of their fields   He died on 13 September 1919.

Literary career
During this period, his philosophical essays were published. He was editor in Lahore then subneditor in New Delhi  then Editor in Hyderabad dakhan  He was founder of sindhi prose , and also founder of generalism in sindhi prose and also called Baba e sahafat (صحافت جو ڏاڏو آدم) He also provided services for the “Sindh Muhammadan Association”. He made people realize that Muslims must unite and, through his poetry, he taught Muslims to take the right path. After the death of Hassan Ali Effendi, Shamsuddin became sub editor of Daily Khair Khuwa (Larkana), Daily Musafir (Hyderabad) and Daily Aftaab (Sukkur). It is said that he introduced humor to Sindhi poetry. He was one of those who are remembered as pioneers of Modern Sindhi Literature. 
He founded Madarast ul Islam in Mehar in 1906.

Publication
His poetic collection was published by Sindhi Adabi Board in 1969.

Shamsudin Bulbul Foundation
For the betterment of education in remote areas of Sindh, Bulbul's family runs the Shamsudin Bulbul Foundation in Jamshoro, Sindh.

Death
He died on 13 September 1919.

References

1857 births
1919 deaths